Dublin to Detroit is the sixth studio album by Irish boy band Boyzone. It was released on 21 November 2014 by East West Records. It is the group's first concept album and features renditions of classic Motown hits. Dublin to Detroit became the group's lowest-charting studio album of their career, charting outside the top 10 of the charts in both Ireland and the United Kingdom. The album has been certified silver by the British Phonographic Industry (BPI) for shipments of 60,000 copies in the United Kingdom.

Background
On 17 July 2014, it was announced that Boyzone would be releasing an album called From Dublin to Detroit, an album with covers of Motown hits. Keith Duffy said "We're basically just covering some of our favourite songs from the Motown era, and putting a full album together. So we've got 11 really exciting tracks coming out. It's going to give us a whole new catalogue of music to perform. And it will be very interesting how it fits in with our own back catalogue. It's kind of rejuvenating us. It's giving us just good times and good memories in the studio. So fingers crossed people will receive it well and it goes well for us."

On 29 September, a few songs from the album were announced on Twitter; "What Becomes of the Brokenhearted", "The Tracks of My Tears", "Just My Imagination" and "I'm Doin' Fine Now" (not actually a Motown song).

Music videos
Boyzone have released videos for the songs "What Becomes of the Brokenhearted", "Reach Out I'll Be There" and "Wherever I Lay My Hat".

Reception

Critical reception

Lauren Murphy of The Irish Times wrote: "It's a no-brainer that Boyzone have decided to release a covers album in the run-up to Christmas; what is more puzzling is their decision to cover this collection of Motown classics in a style that is closer to karaoke than anything else. Ronan Keating occasionally makes way for Mikey Graham on lead vocals as they tackle the likes of Tracks of My Tears, I’m Doing Fine Now and You Can’t Hurry Love; but with a cheesy backing track providing the music, the vitality and soul of most of these songs are rendered flat and schmaltzy. Cynicism placed firmly aside, a live band and some creative arrangements might have made all the difference."

Jamie Parmenter of RenownedForSound wrote: "Tracks of my Tears takes a sombre tone with great vocal emotion before breaking into the instantly recognisable chorus; Ronan's having fun here as lead singer and it really shows. I don’t think anyone could do a bad cover of Higher and Higher and the boys don’t disappoint here. Just My Imagination is one of the lesser-known tracks on the record, but this is exactly what makes it stand out as an album highlight. The band do a great job with warm and comforting vocals, perfectly suited for the slow nature of the song. What Becomes of the Broken Hearted has nice vocal harmonising, but the swapping of lead vocals drowns out the essence of the heartbreak, whereas You Can't Hurry Love was always going to be a distant third choice behind The Supremes and Phil Collins efforts. Tears for a Clown's main vocals seem a little drowned out amongst the many layers, and to finish off, the band decided to end with a Christmas song. This makes for an odd climax to the album. Overall Dublin to Detroit is an album of contrasts. On the one hand their vocals are usually strong and suit the music, but they haven't made much attempt to make the tracks their own. I’d say they still have more to give us, and as such I’d like to hear a new record of original material in the future to see if they’ve still got it."

Nick Cole of Scunthorpe Telegraph wrote: "It's 20 years since Ronan and the boys first charted in the UK with Love Me For A Reason. So to celebrate the band hit the rocky road to Detroit with 11 covers of such classics as Higher and Higher, Tracks of My Tears and This Old Heart of Mine. To their credit this salute to the magic of Motown works very well."

Entertainment Focus highlighted the lack of support for Ronan Keating in the songs and "all is going well until someone other than Ronan Keating starts to sing". It commented that What Christmas Means To Me is another moment they enjoyed and made them think maybe the group should have done a Christmas record instead. "The more stripped-back This Old Heart of Mine really exposes the limits to the vocal abilities of the group. Ronan, as is to be expected, sounds fine but when he hands vocals to another member it all kind of just falls flat. The same is true on other songs such as Higher and Higher, and Wherever I Lay My Hat."

Commercial performance
Dublin to Detroit debuted at number 12 on the Irish Albums Chart. In the United Kingdom, the album debuted at number 14 on the UK Albums Chart with first-week sales of 19,451 copies. It is the group's first studio album to not chart in the top 10 of both territories.

Promotion
Boyzone performed a medley of songs from the album on The X Factor Australia live results show on 13 October 2014. On 14 November, the band promotes the album in the UK on BBC One for Children in Need. On 22 November 2014, they performed on The Jonathan Ross Show.

Track listing

Personnel 
 Boyzone - vocals
 Brian Rawling and Paul Meehan – producer
 Dom Liu – assistant engineer
 Adam Phillips – guitar and bass
 Nick Squires – string arrangement and cello
 Ben Hancox and Rustom Pomeroy – violins
 Andy Ross – sax and woodwind
 Ralph Lamb – trumpet
 Nichol Thompson – trombone
 Dick Beetham – mastering
 Matt Furmidge – mixing
 Jon Gilbert – design
 Ray Burmiston – photography
 Shelina Somani-Lewis – styling
 Sarah Brimson – grooming
 Mark Plunkett and Jaqui Heywood – management

Charts

Weekly charts

Year-end charts

Certifications and sales

Release history

References

2014 albums
Boyzone albums
East West Records albums
Albums produced by Brian Rawling
Motown cover albums